Amata nigricornis  is a species of moth of the family Erebidae first described by Sergei Alphéraky in 1883. It is common in Ukraine and found in the southern part of European Russia, the Transcaucasus, Turkey and Iran.

The wingspan is 30–35 mm.

Subspecies
Amata nigricornis nigricornis
Amata nigricornis anatolica (Zerny, 1931)
Amata nigricornis krymaea Obraztsov, 1937
Amata nigricornis turgaica Obraztsov, 1937

References 

nigricornis
Moths of Europe
Moths of Asia
Moths described in 1917